StackTV (stylized in all-caps as STACKTV) is a Canadian subscription video streaming package offered by Corus Entertainment through Amazon's Prime Video Channels. It was announced on June 3, 2019, and launched shortly thereafter as an add-on for Amazon Prime subscribers. 

StackTV functions similarly to a virtual multichannel video programming distributor (vMVPD), providing access to Corus-owned television channels, including both live linear feeds and on-demand programming during Corus' term of license. The service is intended for cord-cutters; providing access to Corus' linear channels through over-the-top media services without the need for a traditional TV service subscription (unlike the Global TV app, which requires an authenticated subscription through a cable service provider). In contrast to the defunct subscription streaming service Shomi (which was operated as a joint venture between Rogers Sports & Media and Corus' sister company, Shaw Communications), StackTV initially offered no exclusive programming beyond that seen on Corus's linear networks and their own on-demand content.

History
In December 2021, StackTV premiered Days of Our Lives: A Very Salem Christmas day-and-date with Peacock in the United States, prior to its linear premiere on W Network the following month.

In January 2022, Corus announced plans to offer StackTV through Rogers Cable's IPTV-based Ignite TV and SmartStream services.

In February 2022, the Canadian version of Lifetime was added to the service.

Corus added their Disney Branded Television suite of services (the Canadian equivalents of Disney Channel, Disney Junior, and Disney XD) to the STACKTV service in December 2022.

Programming
Channels currently offered through the service as of December 2022 include:
Adult Swim
Disney Channel Canada
Disney Junior Canada
Disney XD Canada
Food Network Canada
Global
HGTV Canada
The History Channel
Lifetime Canada
National Geographic
Showcase
Slice
Teletoon
Treehouse 
W Network 
YTV

Reception 

Corus announced in June 2020 that the service had achieved 200,000 subscribers, with executives saying the service had become a "meaningful part of [the company's] portfolio". By June 2021, the combined number of subscribers to StackTV and Corus' other Amazon-based service, Nick+ (later replaced by Teletoon+ in September 2022), had increased to over 600,000 subscribers, similar to those of other streaming services.

References

External links 

 
 StackTV landing page on PrimeVideo.com

Corus Entertainment
Subscription video on demand services
Internet properties established in 2019
2019 establishments in Canada
Canadian video on demand services